Kahina Saidi (born March 17, 1984) is an Algerian judoka, who played for the half-middleweight category. She is a four-time medalist at the African Judo Championships, and a bronze medalist at the 2009 Mediterranean Games in Pescara, Italy. She also won two medals in the same division at the 2007 All-Africa Games in Algiers, and at the 2011 All-Africa Games in Maputo, Mozambique.

Saidi represented Algeria at the 2008 Summer Olympics in Beijing, where she competed for the women's half-middleweight class (63 kg). She defeated Malta's Marcon Bezzina in the first preliminary round, before losing out her next match by an ippon and a juji gatame (back-lying perpendicular armbar) to Netherlands' Elisabeth Willeboordse, who eventually won the bronze medal in this event.

References

External links

NBC Olympics Profile

Algerian female judoka
Living people
Olympic judoka of Algeria
Judoka at the 2008 Summer Olympics
1984 births
Mediterranean Games bronze medalists for Algeria
Competitors at the 2009 Mediterranean Games
African Games gold medalists for Algeria
African Games medalists in judo
African Games bronze medalists for Algeria
Mediterranean Games medalists in judo
Competitors at the 2007 All-Africa Games
Competitors at the 2011 All-Africa Games
21st-century Algerian people